Dr. B. R. Ambedkar University may refer to one of several universities in India:
 Dr. Bhimrao Ambedkar University, Uttar Pradesh
 Dr. B. R. Ambedkar University Delhi
 Dr. B. R. Ambedkar University, Srikakulam, Andhra Pradesh
 Dr. B.R. Ambedkar University of Social Sciences, Madhya Pradesh